Caligula simla is a moth of the  family Saturniidae. It is found in south-eastern Asia, including China and Thailand.

The larvae feed on Quercus and Prunus padus.

External links
Saturniidae breeding

Caligula (moth)
Moths of New Zealand
Moths described in 1847